Nduka Junior Harrison (born 1 August 2001) is a Nigerian footballer who captains Remo Stars F.C. in the Nigeria Professional Football League and plays as a central defender.

Career
Nduka Junior started representing the Remo Stars at under-17 level. He was appointed vice-captain of the club ahead of the 2019-20 Nigeria National League season behind club captain Saheed Lasisi. Nduka Junior’s first game as captain came in the first game of that season, on 25 November, 2019 and he marked it with the only goal of the game in a 1-0 win against Lamray United F.C. Lasisi left the club by mutual consent in September 2020.

A year later, on 26 September, 2021 under Nduka Junior’s captaincy Remo Stars gained promotion to the Nigerian Professional Football League. As captain, Nduka Junior has spoken about his desire to keep Remo Stars playing in the Nigerian top flight as the club has suffered from previous relegations. Nduka Junior personally impressed with reports coming that had “shown his quality with some brilliant displays”, and that he had “been a revelation this season. A constant threat from set-pieces”, including scoring a free-kick in a 1-0 win over eventual champions Rivers United.

In September 2022, Nduka Junior played for the first time in the CAF Confederation Cup after qualification was earned from the Remo Stars finishing 3rd in the 2021-22 Nigeria Professional Football League.

References

External links

2001 births
Living people
Nigerian footballers
Association football defenders